Whitecloud Glacier is a glacier which flows northward between Klokotnitsa Ridge on the east and Tsarevets Buttress on the west to discharge into Charcot Bay just west of Almond Point, Trinity Peninsula. Named by United Kingdom Antarctic Place-Names Committee (UK-APC) in 1960. The name is descriptive of cloud conditions that prevailed at the time of Falkland Islands Dependencies Survey (FIDS) survey of the area in 1948.

See also
 List of glaciers in the Antarctic
 Glaciology

References
 

Glaciers of Trinity Peninsula